Sociedad Deportiva Barreda Balompié is a football team based in Barreda, Torrelavega in the autonomous community of Cantabria. Founded in 1917, the team plays in Tercera División RFEF – Group 3. The club's home ground is Solvay, which has a capacity of 5,100 spectators.

History
In the 2015–16 season the club won regional league Preferente Cantabria. In the 2018–19 season the club finished in the 12th position in the Tercera División, Group 3.

Season to season

47 seasons in Tercera División
1 season in Tercera División RFEF

References

External links
Futbolme team profile 

Football clubs in Cantabria
Association football clubs established in 1917
1917 establishments in Spain
Sports leagues established in 1917